Carrollton is a city in Dallas, Denton, and Collin counties in the U.S. state of Texas. As of the 2020 census, its population was 133,434, making it the 23rd-most populous city in Texas.

History

The area was first settled by Jared Ford in 1842 by William and Mary Larner on a site within the Peters Colony grant. In 1844, the A. W. Perry family claimed land in the area around Trinity Mills where, in partnership with Wade H. Witt, a mill was established.

The English colony, a group of families in the northeastern area of settlement which crossed into Denton County, was home to large landowners including the Furneaux, Jackson, Morgan, and Rowe families. It is most likely that Carrollton was named for Carrollton, Illinois, the original home of many of these settlers.

Early on, Carrollton's livelihood was exclusively agricultural, but following the construction of the Dallas-Wichita Railroad through Trinity Mills in 1878, the community began to grow in its industrial significance. Carrollton's significance was further strengthened when the railroad was extended to Denton in 1880 by Jay Gould, who sold the line to the Missouri–Kansas–Texas Railroad (the Katy) in 1881. By 1885, Carrollton had flour mills, cotton gins, two churches, a school, and a population of 150. The St. Louis Southwestern Railway (the "Cotton Belt") crossed the Katy in 1888, and the town became a shipping center for livestock, cotton, cotton seed, and grain, helping the town surpass Trinity Mills to the north.

In 1913 Carrollton was officially incorporated, and W.F. Vinson was elected mayor. A gravel industry that began in Carrollton in 1912 transformed the city, by the late 1940s, to a "grain and gravel" town. The city also supported a brick plant and a dairy industry, and National Metal Products established itself in the city in 1946.

After World War II the city grew rapidly. In 1950 its population stood at 1,610, and it grew to 4,242 in 1960 and 13,855 in 1970. At this point, significant suburban growth began spilling out of north Dallas, and the city grew tremendously between 1970 and 1980, with a documented growth of 193% to 40,595 inhabitants. By 1983, the population was 52,000, by 1990, it had reached 82,169, and by 2010 the population had grown to 119,097.

As a suburb of Dallas, in 2006 named to America's "Top 100 Places to Live" by Relocate America. Also in 2006, it was selected as the 19th best place to live in the United States by Money magazine. In 2008 it was named by Money magazine the 15th best place to live among small cities.

In 1996 there was a successful recall of Mayor Gary Blanscet and council members Linda Caldwell, Bernis Francis, Stan Hampton, Bob Novinsky, Bert Colter & Stan Sewell. All were removed from office and replaced in a special election.

Geography

Carrollton is located in portions of three counties: Dallas, Denton, and Collin.

Climate
On average, the warmest month is July. The highest recorded temperature was 112 °F in 1980. The average coolest month is January. The lowest recorded temperature was 1 °F in 1989. The most precipitation on average occurs in May. Carrollton is considered to have a humid subtropical climate.

Demographics

In 1920, Carrollton had a population of 573; since then, its population has experienced positive growth as a suburb of the city of Dallas. In 2010, its population was 119,097, becoming the 23rd-most populous city in Texas. Retaining its position as the 23rd-most populous Texas city at the publication of the 2020 census and 2020 American Community Survey, 133,434 people, 49,675 households, and 34,141 families resided in the city.

With a 2010 population density of 3,209.8 people per square mile (1,239.3/km2), the city had a median age of 37.8 in 2020 and for every 100 females there were 94.6 males. Among its population in 2020, 5.2% were under 5 years of age, 21.2% under 18 years of age, and 78.8% aged 18 and older; approximately 11.6% of the population were aged 65 and older per the American Community Survey's 5-year estimates.

At the 2010 census, the median income for a household in the city was $70,960 and the median income for a family was $68,672. The per capita income for the city was $26,746. About 4.1% of families and 5.6% of the population were below the poverty line, including 7.4% of those under age 18 and 6.3% of those age 65 or over. By 2020, the median household income increased to $82,345; families had a median income of $95,235; married-couple families $105,361; and non-family households $58,811. An estimated 6.5% of the population lived at or below the poverty line from 2015 to 2020, and 77% of the population are employed by private companies.

Race and ethnicity
Like much of the continually diversifying United States, Carrollton was once a predominantly non-Hispanic white community. With continued immigration and birth rates among traditional minorities, Carrollton's population became more racially, ethnically, and culturally diverse; according to the 2010 census, the racial makeup of the city was 63.6% White, 8.4% Black or African American, 0.6% American Indian and Alaska Native, 13.4% Asian, 0.03% Native Hawaiian or other Pacific Islander, 10.8% some other race, and 3.1% from two or more races. Hispanic or Latino Americans of any race were 30.0% of the population. Since the 2020 census, non-Hispanic whites have made up 37.42% of the population, with Hispanic or Latino Americans increasing to 31.68% of the population. Black or African Americans were 9.84% of the population, and Asian Americans grew to 16.76% of the population. Pacific Islanders and people of other races made up a constituent minority of 0.07% and 0.4% each, and multiracial Americans increased to 3.53% of the population.

Economy

As a suburb of Dallas, the city of Carrollton has sustained its own economic identity with the growing metropolitan area within North Texas. Most notably, Carrollton has become the headquarters for FASTSIGNS International, Inc., Halliburton's Easywell in Carrollton, Heelys, Inc., Motel 6 (G6 Hospitality), SECURUS Technologies, and Woot Inc. (Subsidiary of Amazon).

Carrollton is home to the largest Korean community in Texas and the southern United States. Koreatown Carrollton, located at the intersection of Old Denton Road and President George Bush Turnpike, is home to a large number of Asian restaurants and businesses further stimulating the local and regional economies.

Government
According to the city's 2018 Comprehensive Annual Financial Report, the city's various funds had $150,984,518 in revenue, $151,204,878 in expenditures, $529,903,760 in total assets, $265,901,182 in total liabilities, and $177,408,987 in cash and investments.

Carrollton is a voluntary member of the North Central Texas Council of Governments association, the purpose of which is to coordinate individual and collective local governments and facilitate regional solutions, eliminate unnecessary duplication, and enable joint decisions.

Carrollton has a city council that consists of seven members and a mayor. The current mayor is Steve Babick. The city council is responsible for establishing city policies, considering city resolutions and ordinances, appointing citizens to various city boards and commissions, adopting the city's Comprehensive Plan and annual budget, and approving or rejecting zoning changes; it meets on the first and third Tuesday of every month.

Education

Primary and secondary schools

Most of Carrollton is a part of the Carrollton-Farmers Branch Independent School District which is within Dallas and Denton counties. Dallas Independent School District also serves a small portion of Carrollton in the southeast and Coppell Independent School District covers a portion to the southwest, both in Dallas County. The Lewisville Independent School District covers the northern sections of the city.

The portion of Carrollton in Collin County is within the Plano Independent School District.

CFBISD operates three high schools in Carrollton: Newman Smith High School, R.L. Turner High School, and Creekview High School. Lewisville ISD operates Hebron High School.

The DISD portion is served partially by Jerry R. Junkins Elementary School in Carrollton, Ewell D. Walker Middle School in Dallas, and W. T. White High School in Dallas. Private schools in the area include The Saint Anthony School, Carrollton Christian Academy. At one time Coram Deo Academy had a campus in Carrollton.

There are three major charter schools in Carrollton. Carrollton Classical Academy, grades K–9, which holds classes at the recently purchased First Baptist Carrollton Josey Campus, Harmony School of Innovation, grades K–8, and Trivium Academy, grades K–8, which holds classes on the campus of First Methodist Carrollton. The 13,000-capacity Tommy Standridge Stadium is located in Carrollton; it is mostly used for high school football and soccer.

Colleges and universities

Areas in Dallas County and in CFBISD (which is partially in Denton County) are in the zone for Dallas College (formerly Dallas County Community College or DCCCD). Areas in Collin County are in the zone for Collin College. Areas in most of Denton County (including the Lewisville School District) are in the North Central Texas College district.

Public libraries

Carrollton Public Library has two locations: Hebron & Josey and Josey Ranch Lake.

Weekend education

The Japanese School of Dallas, a supplementary Japanese school, conducts its classes at Ted Polk Middle School in Carrollton. The school has its main offices in Farmers Branch.

Transportation 
Carrollton is connected to the Metroplex's highway network by Interstate 35E and the President George Bush Turnpike, as well as the Sam Rayburn Tollway at the far north end of the city.

Dallas/Fort Worth International Airport is five miles southwest of Carrollton, and Dallas Love Field is eight miles south.

The Green Line of Dallas Area Rapid Transit's DART Rail system terminates at North Carrollton/Frankford Station and has additional stops within the city limits at Trinity Mills and Downtown Carrollton. Trinity Mills is also the southern terminus of Denton County's A-train, which provides service to Lewisville and Denton. Downtown Carrollton is a planned stop on DART's Silver Line, which is under construction and expected to open in 2023.

Notable people

 Carson Blair, former catcher for the Oakland Athletics
 David Blough, quarterback for NFL's Minnesota Vikings, attended Creekview High School
 Amanda Bouldin, New Hampshire politician from Carrollton
 Ashley Cain, 2019 U.S. figure skating champion in the pairs discipline 
 Rafael Cruz, father of U.S. Senator Ted Cruz
 Laganja Estranja, drag performer, contestant on RuPaul's Drag Race
 Cherami Leigh, actress/voice actress
 Rhema Marvanne, child gospel singer featured in movie Machine Gun Preacher
 Jason Maxiell, forward for NBA's Detroit Pistons, attended Newman Smith High School
 Katie Meili, Olympic swimmer who won gold and bronze medals at the 2016 Summer Olympics.
 Keith Moreland, professional baseball player and broadcaster; attended R.L. Turner High School
 Noah Ringer, Taekwondo champion and The Last Airbender actor
 Ryan Russell, professional football player
 Melissa Rycroft, former Dallas Cowboys cheerleader and Dancing with the Stars and The Bachelor contestant
 Taylor Teagarden, catcher for MLB's Baltimore Orioles, attended Creekview High School
 Vanilla Ice (Robert Van Winkle), rapper and reality TV star; attended R.L. Turner High School
 Deron Williams, point guard for NBA's Cleveland Cavaliers, attended Arbor Creek Middle School
 Travis Wilson, wide receiver for NFL's Cleveland Browns, attended Creekview High School

Notes

References

External links

 
 

 
Cities in the Dallas–Fort Worth metroplex
Cities in Texas
Cities in Collin County, Texas
Cities in Dallas County, Texas
Cities in Denton County, Texas
Populated places established in 1842
1842 establishments in the Republic of Texas